Dermot Whelan (born 16 February 1973) is an Irish comedian and television and radio presenter who has worked for both Raidió Telifís Éireann and in the commercial sector. He can currently be heard on Today FM as one half of Dermot & Dave.

A native of Limerick, Whelan is a regular contributor on RTÉ's The Panel. He is also the former host of Republic of Telly and has performed at major comedy festivals, including the Kilkenny Cat's Laugh Festival and the Edinburgh Festival Fringe. Whelan was a co-host of the 98FM Morning Crew radio show in Dublin, alongside Cheesey Dave and Siobhan O'Connor.  Whelan also worked for Dublin City FM in his early career.

Other television credits include The Soccer Show on TV3 and appearances on The Property Game on the same station.

In 2014, Dermot and his fellow host and friend, Dave Moore both joined the Irish independent national station, Today FM, with their show, "Dermot and Dave" first airing every Monday to Friday from midday to 2:30 p.m. They have since moved to the 9a.m.-midday slot, broadcasting there from January 2017 onwards.

In addition to being a DJ, comedian and TV presenter, Whelan is also the drummer for the Irish punk rock band, the 123Fours.

Awards
Whelan won a Meteor Music Award in 2009 for Best Regional DJ with co-hosts Dave Moore and Siobhan O'Connor for their morning time radio show.

|-
| 2009 || Dermot Whelan || Best Regional DJ at the Meteor Awards || 
|-

References

External links
 Official website

Living people
Dublin's 98FM presenters
Irish male comedians
RTÉ television presenters
Mass media people from Limerick (city)
Virgin Media Television (Ireland) presenters
Today FM presenters
People educated at Crescent College
1973 births